Glaisdale School was an independent preparatory school on Arundel Road in Cheam situated in the London Borough of Sutton.

History
Glaisdale School was opened by Agnes White, assisted by her daughter Berthain, in 1925 in a private detached house in Brighton Road Sutton. To accommodate growing numbers after the Second World War it enlarged by acquiring the detached house next door and filling the space in between. In the 1990s a hall was added. Despite consistently good inspection findings from the Office for Standards in Education (OFSTED), the school closed on 14 July 2005. The last head girl was Katie Walden-Hall.

Education

The school was attended by children from the surrounding residential area who could enter via the nursery or older. The provision of education was deemed by independent inspection as very good or excellent in all areas including mathematics, language, literacy, physical and creative development and the quality of teaching and assessment was deemed excellent in the last inspection by OFSTED.  The addition of the hall provided an area for gymnastics, music and movement, football, dance and drama as well as morning assembly.

Alumni
Sarah Fisher - Animal Practitioner of Talking to Animals fame. Married to Anthony Head.
Ian Stewart - Early member of The Rolling Stones.

Former Head teachers
Mrs White (from 1925 to 1938 (deceased))
Mrs E R A Hayter (from 1938 to 1965 (retired))
Mrs Vera Froy and Mrs Lini Hughes (1965 - 1979)
Mrs Jean Collins (1979 - 1987)
Mrs Judith Hurst (1987 - 1990)
Mrs Helen Steel (1990 - 1999)
Mrs Helen Potter (1999 -2005 )
Mrs L Rose (2005)

References

Defunct schools in the London Borough of Sutton
Educational institutions established in 1925
1925 establishments in England
Educational institutions disestablished in 2005
2005 disestablishments in England